Nicoll Fosdick (November 9, 1785 in New London, New London County, Connecticut – May 7, 1868 in New London, Connecticut) was an American merchant and politician from New York.

Life
He was the son of Nicoll Fosdick (1750–1821) and Abigail (Eldredge) Fosdick (1761–1809). He completed preparatory studies. He removed to Norway, New York and engaged in mercantile pursuits.

He was a presidential elector in 1816 and voted for James Monroe and Daniel D. Tompkins. He was a member of the New York State Assembly in 1818 and 1819.

Fosdick was elected as an Adams man to the 19th United States Congress, holding office from March 4, 1825, to March 3, 1827.

He returned to New London in 1843. He was Collector of Customs at the Port of New London from 1849 to 1853.

He was buried at the Cedar Grove Cemetery in New London.

References

The New York Civil List compiled by Franklin Benjamin Hough (pages 71, 81, 193f, 274, 321, 325; Weed, Parsons and Co., 1858)
History of New London, Connecticut by Francis Caulkins (page 649)
Fosdick genealogy at Ancestry.com

External links

1785 births
1868 deaths
Politicians from New London, Connecticut
National Republican Party members of the United States House of Representatives from New York (state)
1816 United States presidential electors
Members of the New York State Assembly
People from Herkimer County, New York
19th-century American politicians